Lindale High School (also called Lindale High, LHS or simply Lindale) is a public secondary school located in the Northeast Texas town of Lindale.  Lindale High is a part of the Lindale Independent School District and includes grades 9 through 12. The school serves most of Lindale and nearby Hideaway Lake. A small portion of eastern Van Zandt County also lies within the district.

Extracurricular activities

Athletics 
The Lindale Eagles compete in the following athletics:

Cross Country, Volleyball, Football, Basketball (men's and women's), Powerlifting, Marching Band, Soccer, Golf, Tennis, Track, Softball & Baseball.

State Titles
Boys Golf - 
1995(3A)
Softball - 
2004(3A)
Marching Band - 
2020(4A)

Notable alumni 
Miranda Lambert, Grammy Award-winning country music recording artist
Pat Mahomes, professional baseball player
 Kelli Finglass, Dallas Cowboys Cheerleaders

References

External links 

 
 Lindale Independent School District

Schools in Smith County, Texas
Public high schools in Texas